Hristina Ruseva (Bulgarian Cyrillic: Христина Русева) (born on 1 October 1991) is an international volleyball player from Bulgaria. She currently plays for Bulgaria and Prosecco DOC Imoco Conegliano as middle blocker.

Awards

Clubs
 2009-10 Bulgarian League -  Champions, with CSKA Sofia
 2010-11 Bulgarian Cup -  Champions, with CSKA Sofia
 2010-11 Bulgarian League -  Champions, with CSKA Sofia
 2019-20 Bulgarian League -  Champions, with Maritsa Plovdiv
 2021 Italian Supercup -  Champions, with Imoco Volley Conegliano
 2021-22 Italian Cup (Coppa Italia) -  Champion, with Imoco Volley Conegliano
 2021–22 Italian League -  Champion, with Imoco Volley Conegliano

References 

1991 births
Living people
Sportspeople from Sofia
Bulgarian women's volleyball players
Galatasaray S.K. (women's volleyball) players
European Games competitors for Bulgaria
Bulgarian expatriate sportspeople in Turkey
Middle blockers
Expatriate volleyball players in Turkey
Volleyball players at the 2015 European Games
20th-century Bulgarian women
21st-century Bulgarian women